Rokoko is a Danish brand of consumer motion capture and animation technology products. It was founded in 2015 in Copenhagen, Denmark with additional offices located in Athens, Greece, and San Francisco, USA.  It manufactures the Smartsuit Pro, an IMU motion capture suit used by animators, game developers, vTubers.

History
Rokoko was founded by Jakob Balslev, Matias Søndergaard, and Anders Klok in March 2014, however the idea came to them when they were at the National Film School of Denmark. Initially, they launched a Kickstarter campaign for the Smartsuit Pro. The motion capture technology, unveiled in December 2016, uses a wireless body suit and integrates with software development platforms. The company also produces the Smartgloves for finger tracking, as well as software for face tracking.

Smartsuit Pro II, the next generation of Smartsuit Pro, was announced in 2021.

References

Virtual reality companies
Technology companies established in 2015
Software companies based in Copenhagen
Manufacturing companies based in Copenhagen
Consumer electronics retailers
Consumer electronics brands
2014 establishments in Denmark
Companies based in Copenhagen Municipality